The 1985 FIBA Under-19 World Championship for Women took place in the United States from 13 to 21 August 1985. It was co-organised by the International Basketball Federation (FIBA) and USA Basketball.

Ten national teams competed for the championship. Soviet Union came away with the Gold medal by defeating South Korea 80-75 in the final.

Venues
 United States Olympic Training Center at Colorado Springs, Colorado, United States

Qualification

It is unknown how Canada, Cuba, and Australia qualified and why Czechoslovakia who finished 3rd in the previous year's European championship did not participate.

Preliminary round
All times are local (UTC-6).

Group A

Group B

Knockout stage

Bracket

5–8th place

Semifinals

Semi-finals

Finals

Final standings

Awards

References

External links
 Official Web of 1985 FIBA World Championship for Junior Women.

FIBA Under-19 Women's Basketball World Cup
World Championship for Women
International women's basketball competitions hosted by the United States
1985–86 in American basketball